Veselý (feminine: Veselá) is a Czech and Slovak surname meaning "merry" or "cheerful".

Notable people with the surname Veselá include:
 Hana Veselá, Czech figure skater
 Jana Veselá (born 1983), Czech basketball player
 Jarmila Veselá (1899–1972), Czech criminal lawyer
 Libuše Veselá (1900–1973), Czech figure skater
 Markéta Veselá (born 1970), Czech architect

Notable people with the surname Veselý include:
 Aleš Veselý (1935–2015), Czech sculptor
 Bohumil Veselý (born 1945), Czech footballer
 Dalibor Vesely (1934–2015), Czech architect
 František Veselý (1943–2009), Czech footballer
 Jan Veselý (born 1990), Czech basketball player
 Jan Veselý (cyclist) (1923–2003), Czech cyclist
 Jaroslav Veselý (born 1937), Czech sport shooter
 Jindřich Veselý (1885–1939), Czech puppeteer
 Jiří Veselý (born 1993), Czech tennis player
 Matt Vesely, Australian filmmaker, director of Monolith (2022)
 Ondřej Veselý (born 1977), Czech ice hockey player
 Petr Veselý (canoeist) (born 1976), Czech canoeist
 Petr Veselý (footballer) (born 1971), Czech footballer
 Radek Veselý (born 1996), Czech ice hockey player
 Tim Vesely (born 1963), Canadian musician and songwriter
 Václav Veselý (1900–1941), Czech gymnast
 Vítězslav Veselý (born 1983), Czech javelin thrower
 Vladimír Veselý (born 1976), Slovak footballer
 Vlastimil Veselý (born 1993), Czech footballer

See also
 
 
Veselá (disambiguation)
Veselé (disambiguation)
Veselí (disambiguation)
Vesyoly, alternatively spelled Vesely; name of several rural localities in Russia

References

Czech-language surnames